Liptena catalina, the red-patch liptena, is a butterfly in the family Lycaenidae. It is found in Sierra Leone, Liberia, Ivory Coast, Ghana, Nigeria, Cameroon and Gabon. The habitat consists of forests.

The larvae are possibly associated with ground-dwelling ants.

References

Butterflies described in 1887
Liptena
Butterflies of Africa
Taxa named by Henley Grose-Smith
Taxa named by William Forsell Kirby